Zero Punctuation is a series of video game reviews created by English comedy writer and video game journalist Ben "Yahtzee" Croshaw. Since the series began in 2007, episodes have been published weekly by internet magazine The Escapist. Episodes typically range from 5 to 6 minutes in length. Videos provide caustic humour, rapid-fire delivery, visual gags and critical insight into recently released video games, with occasional reviews of older games and retrospectives of the industry itself.

History 
Prior to Zero Punctuation, Croshaw primarily authored content for his blog, Fully Ramblomatic, and would occasionally review video games, often with an emphasis on humor and criticism. In July 2007, Croshaw uploaded two game reviews in video format to YouTube in the same style that would eventually be used for Zero Punctuation: one of the demo of The Darkness for the PlayStation 3, and the other of Fable: The Lost Chapters for the PC. Both were well-received and The Escapist was one of several publishers to offer Croshaw a contract.

The name "Zero Punctuation" refers to the speed of Croshaw's narration. Since its creation, the series has become popular in the gaming community. Video game developers and publishers have occasionally acknowledged Croshaw's reviews of their games, and at least one internet meme has resulted from Zero Punctuation. At the end of every year, Croshaw creates special episodes of Zero Punctuation discussing what he believes were the best and worst games of the year – a practice that started at the end of 2008. He has occasionally dedicated episodes to new technologies or milestones in video gaming, such as E3 and the coming of the eighth generation of consoles.

Since 2014, Croshaw has dedicated certain episodes to covering events or periods in gaming history that he considered to have disparaged the industry or its reputation. These include the video game industry crash of 1983, and the controversial Hot Coffee mod for Grand Theft Auto: San Andreas.

From 2009 to 2017, Croshaw authored a column on The Escapist known as Extra Punctuation. These articles were originally published every Tuesday and often supplemented the previous week's review by discussing a certain topic or trend exhibited by that game. Croshaw resumed the series in 2021 in video format.

Format

In Zero Punctuation, Croshaw usually reviews a game in a highly critical manner using rapid-fire speech delivery accompanied by minimalistic cartoon imagery and animation on a distinctive yellow background, which illustrates what is being said or provides an ironic counterpoint to it. Subtle references or jokes may be inserted to the visuals for comic effect or to add additional context to the narration. His reviews are intended to be humorous with constant usage of puns, analogies, metaphors, and dark humour accompanied by liberal use of profanity. Croshaw usually substitutes the main character or himself with his own avatar, a cartoon man distinguished by a trilby, with other cartoon people in the same style representing the main characters in a video game, celebrities, video game programmers, or friends of Croshaw. Another character used often is an imp-like creature (originally meant to resemble a "darkling" from The Darkness) which represents antagonists, animals, children, or less important characters from a game. Video games, developers, countries, and other entities are often anthropomorphized as box arts, logos, or flags, respectively, with arms and legs. Croshaw often allegorizes jokes, game details, or video game industry activities with references to, or commentaries on popular culture, politics, and history.

Zero Punctuation opens and closes with a theme song, a rock track composed and performed by Ian Dorsch. The ending credits usually feature humorous notes or other information relating to the review, as well as imagery of characters from the review engaging in slapstick. Prior to mid-2008, Zero Punctuation featured commercial songs at the beginning and end of each episode, which were usually related to the context of, or at odds with the game in question, such as The Ramones' "I Wanna Be Sedated" and Eric Johnson's "Cliffs of Dover" at the beginning and end, respectively, of his review of Guitar Hero III: Legends of Rock.

The series' format has proved inspirational for several other web series, such as the critical and educational series Extra Credits and CGP Grey.

Critical style
Croshaw provides highly critical reviews of games, usually pointing out the faults that he implies other professional reviewers ignore in high-profile releases. He tends to disdain certain tropes and conventions in video games he feels have been overused, such as quick time events, highly common uses of motion controls, cover-based shooting, crafting systems, and an unbalanced emphasis on graphics over story or gameplay. Similarly, he has expressed cynicism of the prevalence of specific game designs, including military-themed first-person shooters for being very similar in gameplay, poor in ethics, and contrived in story; open-world games including crafting, collectibles, and stealth mechanics that he feels bloats a game's content; cinematic games that consist of linear, uneventful sections separated by action sequences and brief exploration; and live service games with repetitive gameplay that incorporates grinding to unlock new content. He also disapproves of game franchises that release sequels in rapid succession, such as Final Fantasy, Assassin's Creed, and Call of Duty. Croshaw generally does not review certain genres of games, such as sports and racing games, and has openly admitted to not liking most JRPGs, real-time strategy games, fighting games, or simulation games.

Although Zero Punctuation episodes are usually intended to highlight Croshaw's criticisms of video games, his opinions are not universally negative, and any positive feelings towards the aspects of a game will usually be explicitly stated. During his review of Portal, he admitted to being unable to find any faults with the game. He opened his review of BioShock by saying "nobody likes it when I'm being nice to a game," referring to the negative reception of his favorable review of Psychonauts.

Croshaw cites the work of British television critic and PC Zone journalist Charlie Brooker as the "main inspiration" for his own reviewing style, as well as the writings of Douglas Adams, Sean "Seanbaby" Riley, Victor Lewis-Smith, and Old Man Murray's Chet Faliszek and Erik Wolpaw. He expressed respect towards the late Roger Ebert, noting that he "might one day aspire to being his videogaming equivalent".

Games of the Year
Since 2008, Croshaw has created annual, year-end episodes of Zero Punctuation which enumerate his favorite and least favorite games from that year. For 2008 and 2009, mock "awards" were given for games based on arbitrarily defined categories. Starting with 2010, the "awards" format was replaced with ordered lists of his five favorite and least favorite games of the year. For 2015, he added a new category for his choices of the blandest and least innovative games of the year. As of 2017, the episodes systematically alternate between his selections for the "five best, five blandest, and five worst games of the year" in ascending order. To commemorate the end of the 2010s, Croshaw ranked in order of preference the best and worst games he had awarded during the decade.

In his 2013 lists, he also awarded the "Lifetime Achievement Award for Total Abhorrence" to Ride to Hell: Retribution, expressing that it was so poor in quality that he hardly considered it a game but rather saw it as "congealed failure."

Reception
In his 2008 review of The Witcher, Croshaw sarcastically referred to the PC gaming community as "the glorious PC gaming master race", intending to criticize the perceived elitist attitudes in that community. The phrase has since become an internet meme, and has been appropriated and championed by that community. In a 2018 review, Croshaw explained that he regretted calling the community "PC master race" instead of "dick-slurp all-stars," citing a continuation of the behavior that originally prompted the term.

Croshaw's negative review of Super Smash Bros. Brawl in 2008 was poorly received by fans of the game. He claimed to have received a disproportionate amount of hate mail following the review, and dedicated an episode to highlight and respond to various e-mails that he had allegedly received in response to it.

In 2009, Croshaw reviewed Prototype by comparing it to InFamous, attempting to decide which game was better. Unable to determine a victor, he jokingly suggested that the developers of each game send him artwork of the opposing game's main character wearing lingerie in order to claim the award. Radical Entertainment and Sucker Punch – the respective developers – unexpectedly complied with the challenge, prompting Croshaw to declare InFamous the winner after judging the quality of the images.

In 2013, Croshaw came under fire after an episode of Zero Punctuation contained a metaphor that was viewed as transphobic. Croshaw agreed with the criticism and apologized, expressing regret towards making the statement. The offending remark was retroactively omitted from the video.

Croshaw was one of the founders of the Mana Bar, a video gaming lounge in Brisbane that operated from 2010 until 2015. Croshaw's popularity through Zero Punctuation has been credited with the initial success of the establishment.

References

External links

Zero Punctuation at The Escapist
Extra Punctuation at The Escapist
 Fully Ramblomatic, Yahtzee Croshaw's personal website

British satire
Video game journalism
Black comedy
Satirical websites